Emerson Andrew Frostad (born January 13, 1983) is a Canadian former baseball catcher. Frostad participated in the 2008 Olympics, as a member of Canada's baseball team.

External links

Minor League Baseball

1983 births
Baseball people from British Columbia
Baseball players at the 2008 Summer Olympics
Baseball players at the 2011 Pan American Games
Canadian expatriate baseball players in the United States
Olympic baseball players of Canada
Pan American Games gold medalists for Canada
Clinton LumberKings players
Bakersfield Blaze players
Frisco RoughRiders players
Oklahoma RedHawks players
Oklahoma City RedHawks players
Lancaster Barnstormers players
Corpus Christi Hooks players
Living people
Sportspeople from Vancouver
Lewis–Clark State Warriors baseball players
People educated at Western Canada High School
Pan American Games medalists in baseball
Medalists at the 2011 Pan American Games
West Oahu Canefires players
Trois-Rivières Aigles players